Albert Blakeslee White (September 22, 1856July 3, 1941) was the 11th governor of West Virginia from 1901 to 1905.

White was educated in the public schools of Columbus, Ohio. In 1878, he graduated from Marietta College. In 1879, he married Agnes Ward.  White began his career in journalism as a managing editor in Lafayette, Indiana and relocated to Parkersburg, West Virginia (Wood County) in 1881. He continued to work as a politically powerful editor in Parkerburg until 1889.

In 1889, White was appointed by President Benjamin Harrison as collector of internal revenue for West Virginia. He was later reappointed by President William McKinley in 1897.

In 1900, White was the Republican nominee for Governor of West Virginia and defeated Democrat John H. Holt by 19156 votes.

In 1916, White failed to win the Republican nomination for the US Senate having been defeated by Howard Sutherland; however, he later was elected to the West Virginia Senate.

White died in Parkersburg in 1941.

References

External links
The West Virginia & Regional History Center at West Virginia University houses the papers of Albert B. White in collection A&M 110
 Biography of Albert B. White
 Inaugural Address of Albert B. White
 

1856 births
1941 deaths
American Presbyterians
Editors of West Virginia newspapers
Republican Party governors of West Virginia
Marietta College alumni
Politicians from Cleveland
Politicians from Parkersburg, West Virginia
Republican Party West Virginia state senators
Journalists from Ohio
20th-century American politicians